Jackie McKimmie (b 1950) is an Australian writer and director of films and television.

Select Credits
Stations (1983) (short)
Australian Dream (1986)
Waiting (1991)
Gino (1993)
Fireflies (2004) (TV series) - writer

References

External links

Australian film directors
Australian women film directors
Living people
1950 births
Australian television directors
Australian television writers
Australian women television writers
Australian women television directors